Robbins is a ghost town in Lee County, Virginia, United States.

The community has the name of Charles Robbins, a pioneer settler.

References

Geography of Lee County, Virginia
Ghost towns in Virginia